Walter J. Lindner is an ex-German diplomat and professional musician. He is the former state secretary of the German Foreign office from February 2017- March 2019. In his last posting before retirement, he was ambassador of Germany to India from 2019-2022. As a musician he has released five records with a sixth album in the works. He has served as the ambassador to Kenya, also Somalia, Burundi, Seychelles, Venezuela and South Africa, Lesotho und Swaziland. Lindner also served as Special Representative of the German Government for the fight against Ebola (Ambassador).

Diplomatic service 
Walter J. Lindner entered diplomatic service in 1988. He has served numerous postings in Germany's Federal Foreign Office such as Deputy Head of the Task Force for Human Rights, the Federal Foreign Office Spokesperson and Spokesman for Foreign Minister Joschka Fischer. He has been the German Ambassador in Kenya, Seychelles, Venezuela, South Africa and India.

Life as a musician 
At the Richard Strauss Conservatory (de), now part of the University of Music and Performing Arts Munich, Linder learnt the piano, flute, guitar, bass and orchestra conducting. He also studied jazz in Graz, Austria. He then saved enough money driving taxis and trucks in Germany and went to Berklee College of Music in Boston.

References 

1956 births
Living people